"L'Égyptienne" is a world music song performed by Belgian singer Natacha Atlas and French group Les Négresses Vertes. The song was written by Atlas, Matthias Canavese, Stéfane Mellino and Michel Ochowiak and produced by Les Négresses Vertes for the Atlas' second album Halim (1997). It was released as a single in 1998.

Formats and track listings
These are the formats and track listings of major single releases of "L'Égyptienne".

CD single
"L'Égyptienne" (Radio Edit) – 3:28
"L'Égyptienne" (Alternative Frantic Funk radio edit) – 3:39

Promotional CD single
"L'Égyptienne" (Radio Edit) – 3:28
"L'Égyptienne" (Album Version) – 3:59

12-inch single
"L'Égyptienne" (Alternative Frantic Funk instrumental) – 4:58
"L'Égyptienne" (Alternative Frantic Funk mix) – 4:58
"L'Égyptienne" (JR Hypno Funk instrumental) – 4:53
"L'Égyptienne" (JR Hypno Funk vocal) – 4:53

Personnel
The following people contributed to "L'Égyptienne":

Natacha Atlas – lead vocals
Les Négresses Vertes – production
Alf – engineering 
Frank L – artwork

References

External links
Official website

1998 singles
Electronic songs
Natacha Atlas songs
Songs written by Natacha Atlas
1997 songs